Saved by the Pony Express is a 1911 American short silent Western film produced by the Selig Polyscope Company and starring Tom Mix. Also known as Pony Express Rider, it is preserved at the Library of Congress.

Cast
 Tom Mix as Pony Express Rider
 Thomas Carrigan as Happy Jack
 Old Blue as Tom's horse

See also
 Tom Mix filmography

References

External links
 

1911 films
1911 Western (genre) films
1911 short films
American silent short films
American black-and-white films
Selig Polyscope Company films
Silent American Western (genre) films
1910s American films
1910s English-language films